Frédéric Dard (Frédéric Charles Antoine Dard; 29 June 1921, in Bourgoin-Jallieu, Isère, France – 6 June 2000, in Bonnefontaine, Fribourg, Switzerland) was a French crime writer. He wrote more than three hundred novels, plays and screenplays, under his own name and a variety of pseudonyms, including the San-Antonio book series.

Biography

Frédéric Dard wrote 175 adventures of San-Antonio, of which millions of copies were sold. Detective Superintendent Antoine San-Antonio is a kind of French James Bond without gadgets, flanked by two colleagues, the old, sickly but wise inspector César Pinaud and the gargantuesque inspector Alexandre-Benoît Bérurier. He is a member of the French secret service and has to fulfill impossible missions given by "Le Vieux" (the Old Man), later known as "Achilles", the head of the French police. With the help of his colleagues he always succeeds through various adventures.

Dard won the 1957 Grand prix de littérature policière for The Executioner Weeps.

Bibliography

San-Antonio adventures have been translated into different languages, such as Italian, Romanian and Russian. A few have been translated into English:
Tough Justice (Messieurs les hommes), by Cyril Buhler, Sphere Books, London, 1967; Duckworth, London, 1969; Norton, New York, 1969; Paperback Library  63-287, New York
Stone Dead (C'est mort et ça ne sait pas), by Cyril Buhler, 1969, Paperback Library 63-283, New York, 1970
Thugs And Bottles (Du brut pour les brutes), by Cyril Buhler, Sphere Books, London, 1969; Paperback Library 63-306, New York, 1970
The Strangler (La fin des haricots), by Cyril Buhler, 1968, Sphere Books, London, 1969; Paperback Library  63-326, New York, 1970
Knights Of Arabia (Bérurier au sérail), by Cyril Buhler, Duckworth, London, 1969; Paperback Library 63-341, New York, 1970
From A To Z (De "A" jusqu'à "Z"), by Hugh Campbell, Duckworth, 1970,  (9780715604106); Paperback Library 63-352, 1970
Crook's Hill, Paperback Library 63-342, New York
The Sub Killers (La rate au court bouillon), by Cyril Buhler, Michael Joseph, 1971,  (9780718108687)
Alien Archipelago (L'archipel des malotrus), by Hugh Campbell, Michael Joseph, London, 1971,  (9780718108694)

Apart from San-Antonio, Dard wrote number under various other pseudonyms, including Frederic Antony, Verne Goody, William Blessings, Cornel Milk, Frederic Charles and L'Ange Noir.

Pushkin Press published a number of Dard novels written under his own name in the 1950s-1960s:
The Wicked Go to Hell (Les salauds vont en enfer), 2016; 
Bird in a Cage (Le monte-charge), 2016;
Crush (Les Scélérats), 2016;
The Executioner Weeps (Le bourreau pleure), 2017; 
The King of Fools (La pelouse), 2017;
The Gravediggers' Bread (Le Pain des fossoyeurs), 2018;

Further reading 
There is no monograph on San-Antonio or Frédéric Dard in English.

 Dominique Jeannerod, San-Antonio et son double,  PUF, Paris, 2010
 Raymond Milési, San-Antonio premier flic de France,  DLM, Paris, 1996
 François Rivière, Frédéric Dard ou la vie privée de San-Antonio, Fleuve Noir, Paris 2010
 Françoise Rullier-Theuret, Faut pas pisser sur les vieilles recettes : San-Antonio ou la fascination pour le genre Romanesque, Bruylant-Academia, Bruxelles, 2008

References

External links

Frédéric Dard in Encyclopædia Britannica Online
Analysis of the San-Antonio crime novels

1921 births
2000 deaths
People from Bourgoin-Jallieu
French crime fiction writers
Writers from Auvergne-Rhône-Alpes
20th-century French novelists
French male novelists
20th-century French male writers